Madvar (also Romanized as Madvār; also known as Madvīr) is a village in Khursand Rural District, in the Central District of Shahr-e Babak County, Kerman Province, Iran. At the 2006 census, its population was 87, in 23 families.

References 

Populated places in Shahr-e Babak County